Martian dust devils (dust devils on Mars) were first photographed by the Viking orbiters in the 1970s. In 1997, the Mars Pathfinder lander detected a dust devil passing over it. In the first image below, photographed by the Mars Global Surveyor, the long dark streak is formed by a moving swirling column of Martian atmosphere. The dust devil itself (the black spot) is climbing the crater wall. The streaks on the right are sand dunes on the crater floor.

Martian dust devils can be up to fifty times as wide and ten times as high as terrestrial dust devils, and large ones may pose a threat to terrestrial technology sent to Mars. On 7 November 2016, five such dust devils ranging in heights of 0.5 to 1.9 km were imaged in a single observation by the Mars Orbiter Mission in the Martian southern hemisphere.

Mission members monitoring the Spirit rover on Mars reported on March 12, 2005, that a lucky encounter with a dust devil had cleaned the solar panels of that robot. Power levels dramatically increased and daily science work was anticipated to be expanded. A similar phenomenon (solar panels mysteriously cleaned of accumulated dust) had previously been observed with the Opportunity rover, and dust devils had also been suspected as the cause. The electrical activity associated with dust devils is widely thought to generate lightning on Mars, but this has not yet been conclusively detected.

Tracks
Many areas on Mars experience the passage of giant dust devils. These dust devils leave tracks on the surface of Mars because they disturb a thin coating of fine bright dust that covers most of the Martian surface. When a dust devil goes by it blows away the coating and exposes the underlying dark surface. Within a few weeks, the dark track assumes its former bright colour, either by being re-covered through wind action or due to surface oxidation through exposure to sunlight and the Martian atmosphere.

Formation and dynamics

Dust devils occur when the sun warms up the air near a flat, dry surface. The warm air then rises quickly through the cooler air and begins spinning while moving ahead. This spinning, moving cell may pick up dust and sand and leave behind a clean surface.

Observation

Dust devils on Mars have been photographed both from the ground and high overhead from orbit. They have even blown dust off the solar panels of two Rovers on Mars, thereby greatly extending their useful lifetime. The pattern of the tracks has been shown to change every few months. Measurements from the Curiosity Rover confirms that the pressure drops when a dust devil passes nearby.

Changes through time

A dust devil that was previously imaged in 2009, there was information found about two years later showing the tracks visible from the previous imaging are completely different from the old ones meaning there had been a dust storm to erase the old tracks.

Bright dust devil tracks

Generally, Martian dust devils leave a dark track, however light tracks have also been observed. Studies have been done on Earth to understand this phenomenon. Based on a study done in the Turpan desert in China, it is believed that the light Martian tracks are not truly light, and only appear to be so due to the unusually dark surrounding surface. In such cases, the surrounding surface is believed to appear unusually dark due to the clumping of surface particles, which in turn is due to static charge buildup and attraction.

Gallery

See also

 Amazonis Planitia
 Dark slope streaks
 Geology of Mars
 HiRISE
 Martian soil
 Martian soil#Atmospheric dust

References 

Geology of Mars
Surface features of Mars